Urbach is a municipality in the district of Nordhausen, in Thuringia, Germany.

References

Nordhausen (district)